Asha Alice Banks (born 26 November 2003) is an English actress and singer. She began her career as a child actress on the West End. She made her feature film debut in The Magic Flute (2022).

Early life
Banks was born in St Albans, Hertfordshire to parents Sophie and Duncan. She has an older brother. Banks attended Parmiter's School in Garston. She took Saturday drama classes at Top Hat Stage School and participated in Michael Xavier's MX Masterclass on Sundays, of which she is now a patron.

Career
Banks made her television debut in 2011 with minor roles in EastEnders and Call the Midwife, both on BBC One. Banks was seven or eight when she was cast as young Éponine in the long-running musical Les Misérables at the Queen's Theatre in 2012, marking Banks' West End debut. She appeared in the 2014 Almeida and Playhouse Theatre runs of the play 1984.

Banks went on the 2015 UK tour of Annie, playing the eldest orphan Duffy. She joined the West End production of Charlie and the Chocolate Factory at the Theatre Royal, Drury Lane as Violet Beauregard before its closure in 2017. She alternated the roles Pandora Braithwaite in the 2017 off-West End production of The Secret Diary of Adrian Mole Aged 13¾ at the Menier Chocolate Factory and Lisa James in The Boy in the Dress at the Royal Shakespeare Theatre in Stratford-upon-Avon in 2019.

In 2021, Banks played Thea in the London revival of Spring Awakening at the Almeida Theatre. She was also the understudy for Amara Okereke's Wendla. Banks was cast in as Princess Pamina in the German musical film The Magic Flute, marking Banks' feature film debut. The film premiered at the 2022 Zurich Film Festival and had a wide release in 2023. Banks also returned to television in 2022 with a recurring role as Brooke in the BBC iPlayer teen drama Rebel Cheer Squad, a Get Even spinoff.

Filmography

Stage

References

External links
 
 Asha Banks at Spotlight

Living people
2003 births
Actors from St Albans
Actresses from Hertfordshire
English child actresses
English musical theatre actresses